Nikolay Orlov was a Russian wrestler who competed in the 1908 Summer Olympics.

References

External links
 

Year of birth missing
Year of death missing
Olympic wrestlers of Russia
Wrestlers at the 1908 Summer Olympics
Russian male sport wrestlers
Olympic silver medalists for Russia
Olympic medalists in wrestling
Medalists at the 1908 Summer Olympics
20th-century Russian people